Gyp is a word for cheating or swindling.

Gyp or GYP may refer to:


People 
 Gyp Casino, Swedish drummer Jesper Sporre (born 1961)
 Gyp Mills, English sculptor and songwriter David John Mills (born 1946-2019)
 Angelo DeCarlo (1902–1973), American mobster nicknamed "Gyp"
 Harry Horowitz (c. 1889–1914), Jewish-American gangster nicknamed "Gyp the Blood"
 Sibylle Riqueti de Mirabeau (1849–1932), French author and activist, pen name "Gyp"

GYP
 GYP (software), a build software automation tool
 Global Yellow Pages, a real estate developer and digital search company based in Singapore, New Zealand and Australia
 IATA airport code for Gympie Airport, in Queensland, Australia

Other uses 
 Gypsophila paniculata, a species of flowering plant often called "gyp" by florists
 Gyp Rosetti, a character in Boardwalk Empire
 Gyp Mountain (British Columbia), near Falkland, British Columbia, Canada
 Gyp Mountain (Missoula County, Montana) - see List of mountains in Missoula County, Montana, United States

See also 
 Gyps, a genus of Old World vultures
 Jip (disambiguation)